Pareiorhaphis cameroni is a species of catfish in the family Loricariidae. It is native to South America, where it occurs in the basins of the Araranguá River, the Cubataõ River, and the Tubarão River in the state of Santa Catarina in Brazil. The species reaches 17 cm (6.7 inches) in standard length and is believed to be a facultative air-breather.

References 

Loricariidae
Fish described in 1907
Catfish of South America
Fish of Brazil
Taxa named by Franz Steindachner